{{Speciesbox
| image =
| genus = Bolusiella
| species = iridifolia
| authority = (Rolfe) Schltr.
| synonyms_ref = 
| synonyms = Listrostachys iridifolia Rolfe 
}}Bolusiella iridifolia is a species of flowering plant in the family Orchidaceae. It is widespread across much of tropical and southern Africa, as well as the Comoro Islands in the Indian Ocean.Bolusiella iridifolia grows in a cold windy humid environment at high altitudes. The species has succulent leaves that form a fan shape. The inflorescence is periodically covered in brown bracts from which protrude tiny white spurred flowers.

Subspecies
Two subspecies are recognized:Bolusiella iridifolia subsp. iridifolia - from Ivory Coast east to Ethiopia and Tanzania, south to Angola and Zimbabwe; also ComorosBolusiella iridifolia subsp. picea'' P.J.Cribb - from Burundi and Kenya south to Zimbabwe

References

 

Angraecinae
Orchids of Africa
Flora of the Comoros
Plants described in 1897